The 1990–91 Austrian Hockey League season was the 61st season of the Austrian Hockey League, the top level of ice hockey in Austria. Six teams participated in the league, and EC KAC won the championship.

Regular season

Playoffs

Quarterfinals
 ATSE Graz (1) - VEU Feldkirch (4): 1:3 (2:4, 3:6, 3:2, 3:10)
 EC VSV (2) - EC KAC (5): 0:3 (2:4, 3:4, 3:6)
 Wiener EV (3) - EV Innsbruck  (6): 3:2 (9:1, 3:6, 4:1, 4:5, 5:3)

Placing round

Semifinals
 EC KAC (5) - Wiener EV (3): 3:1 (6:4, 4:5, 3:2, 6:3)
 VEU Feldkirch (4) - EC VSV (2): 0:3 (2:4, 3:4, 5:9)

Final
 EC VSV (2) - EC KAC (5): 1:3 (5:6 SO., 3:7, 3:0, 3:4)

External links
Austrian Ice Hockey Association

1990-91
Aus
League